Chris Marshall is an American football wide receiver for the Ole Miss Rebels. He previously played at Texas A&M.

Early life and high school
Marshall grew up in Missouri City, Texas and attended Thurgood Marshall High School. He focused solely on basketball and did not play football until his junior year. In his first season, Marshal caught 45 passes for 1,009 yards and 18 touchdowns. He played in seven games as a senior and had 15 receptions for 466 yards and scored 11 touchdowns. After the season, Marshall played in the 2022 All-American Bowl. He was rated a four-star recruit and committed to play college football at Texas A&M after considering offers from Alabama and USC. Marshall was later re-rated as a five-star recruit.

College career
Marshall enrolled at Texas A&M in July 2022. Marshall was suspended along with three other players for the Aggies' game against Miami. Marshall was suspended a again, for an indefinite period of time, along with two other players following a violation of team rules. He had originally planned to play basketball for Texas A&M after the end of the football season, but was left off the roster by coach Buzz Williams after the second suspension was announced. Following the end of the season Marshall entered the NCAA transfer portal.

Marshall ultimately transferred to Ole Miss.

References

External links
Texas A&M Aggies bio

Living people
Players of American football from Texas
American football wide receivers
Texas A&M Aggies football players
Ole Miss Rebels football players
Year of birth missing (living people)